Peter Malcolm Gordon Moffett (born 13 April 1951), known professionally as Peter Davison, is an English actor with many credits in television dramas and sitcoms. He made his television acting debut in 1975 and became famous in 1978 as Tristan Farnon in the BBC's television adaptation of James Herriot's All Creatures Great and Small stories.

Davison's subsequent starring roles included the sitcoms Holding the Fort (1980–1982) and Sink or Swim (1980–1982), the fifth incarnation of the Doctor in Doctor Who (1981–1984), Dr. Stephen Daker in A Very Peculiar Practice (1986–1988) and Albert Campion in Campion (1989–1990). He also played David Braithwaite in At Home with the Braithwaites (2000–2003), "Dangerous" Davies in The Last Detective (2003–2007) and Henry Sharpe in Law & Order: UK (2011–2014).

Early life
Davison was born to Claude and Sheila Moffett in Streatham, London. Claude was from British Guiana (now Guyana), and worked as a radio engineer before opening a grocer's shop, whilst Sheila worked in intelligence during World War II before becoming a housewife. Davison had three sisters: Shirley, Pamela and Barbara. Whilst in Streatham, he attended Granton Primary School. The family then moved to Knaphill in Surrey. During this time, Davison was a member of an amateur theatre company called the Byfleet Players.

Before becoming an actor, he gained one O-level in English Language at Winston Churchill School, St John's, Woking, Surrey, and then had several odd jobs, including a stint as a mortuary attendant and a Hoffman Press operator. Early aspirations at a teacher-training college or his father's plan for a job at a building society vanished.

Davison studied at the Central School of Speech and Drama. His first job was as an actor and assistant stage manager at the Nottingham Playhouse. He chose the stage name Peter Davison to avoid confusion with the actor and director Peter Moffatt, with whom Davison later worked.  He only uses Davison professionally.

Career
His first television work was a 1975 episode of the children's science fiction television programme The Tomorrow People, alongside American actress Sandra Dickinson, whom he married on 26 December 1978.  Davison portrayed an alien named Elmer, who arrives on Earth along with his sister (played by Dickinson) and his mother, known as "the Mama" (played by Margaret Burton).

In the mid-1970s, during a lull in his acting career, Davison spent 18 months working in a tax office in Twickenham.

In 1976, he was offered a prominent role in the 13-part TV series Love for Lydia opposite Jeremy Irons; the series was broadcast on ITV the following year.

All Creatures Great and Small (1978–1990)
In 1978, Davison's performance as the youthfully mischievous Tristan Farnon in All Creatures Great and Small made him a household name. "I don't know how much it changed my life. It creeps up on you really. You become used to it quickly, I think. I wasn't aware of it suddenly changing my life, although I had a bit more money to spend on rubbish. I bought a house, but the money was rubbish because I was a BBC newcomer, though nobody's money was very good, except probably Robert Hardy's. I remember after the third series I bought a car, which was a Renault 18. I thought it was pretty flash, and I went to this garage to fill up with petrol, and the guy said, 'Aren't you that bloke off the vet series?' I said yes I was, and he said, 'Why are you driving that piece of shit?'"

Davison married for a second time in December 1978. "By March, I was back in the Dales, freezing to death and chasing sheep across the snowy hilltops."

Davison was absent for 24 episodes in the second run of the series, including the majority of series 5 and 6, due to other acting commitments; Alison Lewis, who played Rosie Herriot in the final series, revealed: "I never met Peter Davison because I didn't have any scenes with him." "I didn't ever want to leave the series, it's just that other programmes came up and I wanted to do them," he explained in 2016. "I'd miss the second half of series 5 because of A Very Peculiar Practice and series 6 I missed because I was doing Campion. I was incredibly lucky to move onto the things I did. There was no plan to it; it's just good fortune, being in the right place at the right time. But in the end, when I'd finished Campion and A Very Peculiar Practice, All Creatures was still going and I never had any problem coming back."

"Only days after finishing A Very Peculiar Practice, I was back in Yorkshire to film a second All Creatures Christmas Special," remembered Davison. "I can't remember when the idea of making another series of the show came up, but it was probably long before anyone mentioned it to the actors. Not that we raised too many eyebrows; I felt I had done enough other work to prove to myself that Tristan hadn't hindered my prospects. Quite the reverse, as Doctor Who had proved: Tristan was a stepping stone to other parts. By the end of 1986, it was agreed that the original cast, minus Carol Drinkwater, would re-assemble to film another series," continued Davison. "The date was set for the spring of the following year, dangerously close to the date set for a second series of A Very Peculiar Practice."

Doctor Who (1981–1984 and later revivals)

In 1980, Davison signed a contract to play the fifth incarnation of the Doctor in Doctor Who for three years, succeeding Tom Baker (the Fourth Doctor) and, at age 29, was at the time the youngest actor to have played the lead role, a record he retained for nearly thirty years until Matt Smith (the Eleventh Doctor) took the role in 2009 at age 26.  Attracting such a high-profile actor as Davison was as much of a coup for the programme as getting the role was for him, but he did not renew his contract because he feared being typecast. Patrick Troughton (who had played the Second Doctor and whom Davison had watched on the programme as a teenager) recommended to Davison that he leave the role after three years, and Davison followed his advice. The Fifth Doctor encountered many of the Doctor's best-known adversaries, including the Cybermen in Earthshock (1982) and the Daleks and Davros in Resurrection of the Daleks (1984).

In the 1983 serial Arc of Infinity, in addition to portraying the Fifth Doctor, Davison portrayed the human form of Omega, sharing the role with Ian Collier.

Since leaving Doctor Who, Davison has returned to the franchise several times. He presented the special videotape documentary release Daleks – The Early Years (1993), showcasing selected episodes of missing Dalek stories from both the First and Second Doctor's eras. Davison did, in fact, return to play the Fifth Doctor in the 1993 multi-doctor charity special Dimensions in Time and in the 1997 video game Destiny of the Doctors.

Since 1999, he has reprised his role as the Fifth Doctor in numerous Doctor Who audio dramas for Big Finish Productions; he also reprised the role of Omega in an audio drama of the same name, again sharing the role with Collier. He returned to the TV series in "Time Crash", a special episode written by Steven Moffat for Children in Need; in the episode, which aired on 16 November 2007, the Fifth Doctor met the Tenth Doctor, played by Davison's future son-in-law David Tennant. Tennant later presented a documentary, Come in Number Five, which examined Davison's tenure in some detail, and which was included as a special feature on the 2011 DVD re-release of Resurrection of the Daleks. It is one of many DVD releases of his serials in which Davison has appeared as an in-vision interviewee or in DVD commentary recordings. In 2022, he returned to portray the Doctor on television again in "The Power of the Doctor". With this appearance, he holds the record for the most returns to the role, tieing it with Troughton.

In 2012, Davison expressed further interest in returning to the role of the Doctor for the series' 50th anniversary special, but he did not appear. He did, however, write and direct The Five(ish) Doctors Reboot, an affectionate and comedic fictionalised account of Colin Baker, Sylvester McCoy and himself attempting to get parts in the Anniversary Special, featuring cameos from numerous Doctor Who cast, crew, and famous fans. In July 2018, Davison reprised the role of the Doctor at the live show "The Muppets Take the O2" during the Pigs in Space sketch Mirthshock.

Davison has been critical of some aspects of Doctor Whos original run, and has expressed great admiration for the 21st century revival. In 2008, he spoke unfavourably of some of the writing for the series during his tenure: "There were some very suspect scripts we did, knocked off by TV writers who'd turn their hand to anything. Fair enough, but they weren't science fiction fans. You do get the impression, both with the television series now and Big Finish, that they are fans of science fiction and that's why they are doing those stories." In 2013, he also praised the frisson between the Doctor and companions in the revived series: "They were struggling for many years to make the companions more rounded characters and... they never once thought it was a good idea to put any frisson or sexual tension – even in its most innocent form – between the Doctor and companion. I think it would make it easier to write a better character. All I know is they've struggled for many years to write a good companion's part. I don't think they've ever really managed it till Rose, when the series came back." Interviewed in 2013, Davison stated that The Caves of Androzani, The Visitation and Earthshock were his favourite serials from his time on the series, and that Time-Flight was the biggest disappointment because of a lack of budget.

In 2013, Davison was asked in an interview about the possibility of a female Doctor, to which he replied: "I have a slight problem with that because it’s not as if genders are interchangeable on Gallifrey... I don’t like the idea of the Doctor having a sex change - it’s not as if you would have a female James Bond." In July 2017, Davison reacted positively to the casting of Jodie Whittaker as the Thirteenth Doctor, but expressed the belief that it was "the loss of a role model for boys who I think Doctor Who is vitally important for". He added: "I feel a bit sad about that, but I understand the argument that you need to open it up." Davison closed his Twitter account following the backlash to his comments, saying the "toxicity" from the series’ viewers on both sides of the dispute had been "sobering".

1984–present

After Davison left Doctor Who in 1984, he immediately landed a role in Anna of the Five Towns, a period drama. In 1985, he appeared in an All Creatures Great and Small Christmas special, and a feature-length episode of the American show Magnum, P.I. ("Deja Vu"), set in the UK.

Davison played Dr Stephen Daker, the central character in A Very Peculiar Practice (1986–88). Written by Andrew Davies, it concerns a university's health centre; Daker is the centre's only effective physician. The black comedy-drama ran for two series and had a sequel with A Very Polish Practice in 1992, a television film mainly set in a post-communist Polish hospital. In 1986 he appeared as Lance Fortescue in an episode of the BBC's Miss Marple ("A Pocketful of Rye").		

Davison reprised his role as Tristan Farnon in four more series of All Creatures Great and Small between 1988 and 1990, although he was absent from 24 episodes of the final three to play the lead in Campion, a series based on the period whodunnits of Margery Allingham. He appeared in the sitcoms Fiddlers Three for ITV in 1991, and Ain't Misbehavin' in 1993 and 1995. He played Jim Huxtable in the 1993 TV movie Harnessing Peacocks, based on the novel by Mary Wesley.

In 1994, he provided the voice of Mole in The Wind in the Willows animated special Mole's Christmas. He also appeared as a doctor in Heartbeat episode "A Bird in the Hand", and played Squire Gordon in the 1994 film of Black Beauty.

Davison presented Heavenly Bodies, a six-part series about astronomy broadcast on BBC1 in 1995. This led to him being featured on the cover of Practical Astronomy magazine.

He guest starred in the sixth episode of the crime drama Jonathan Creek in 1998 as the son-in-law of a horror writer who was shot dead on Halloween. The following year he played the outgoing head teacher in the television series Hope and Glory, and appeared in Parting Shots, the last film to be directed by Michael Winner.

It was not until 2000 that Davison returned in another major role, that of David Braithwaite in At Home with the Braithwaites. During convention appearances in 2013, Davison cited this as his favourite among the roles he has played. Also in 2000, he appeared in the recurring role of Inspector Christmas in several episodes of Diana Rigg's Mrs Bradley Mysteries. The first episode, Death at the Opera, saw Davison appear with his future son-in-law (and future Doctor Who actor), David Tennant.

He starred as Dangerous Davies in the television series The Last Detective (2003–2007) and as Dr Bill Shore in Distant Shores (2005–2008), both for ITV. In 2006, he appeared as Professor George Huntley in The Complete Guide to Parenting, and appeared as himself in the TV series Hardware.

Davison starred as Martin Chadwick, one half of an overworked couple coping with two irresponsible daughters and his senile mother at home, in the BBC Two comedy Fear, Stress and Anger in early 2007. The show also starred his daughter Georgia Tennant. Later in 2007, he played Hubert Curtain in an episode of ITV's Agatha Christie's Marple ("At Bertram's Hotel").

In January 2009, he appeared in Unforgiven, an ITV1 drama starring Suranne Jones. Davison played John Ingrams, a lawyer who helps Jones' character, Ruth Slater, find her sister after her release from prison. In July 2009, he appeared in an episode of Midsomer Murders, and made a guest appearance as a teacher in Miranda Hart's sitcom, Miranda, in autumn 2009. In October 2009, Davison was seen in a small but memorable role as a bank manager in Micro Men, a drama about the rise of the British home computer market in the late 1970s and early 1980s, and in December 2009, he played Denis Thatcher in The Queen, a docudrama on Channel 4.

In November 2010, it was announced that Davison would be joining the regular cast of the UK version of Law and Order as Henry Sharpe, the Director of the London Crown Prosecution Service (CPS). Davison's appeared from the beginning of the series' fifth season, alongside fellow Doctor Who actress Freema Agyeman. He appeared in an episode of the police comedy-drama New Tricks in 2011, and in 2013 he played divorcee Michael in the comedy series Pat and Cabbage, as well as appearing in an episode of the ITV detective series Lewis.

Davison had been lined up to appear in writer/director Daisy Aitkens' first feature-length film You, Me and Him (previously titled Fish Without Bicycles) in late 2016. However, due to a scheduling clash, Davison was forced to pull out of the film. The film stars his son-in-law David Tennant, and is co-produced by Davison's daughter, Georgia.

In 2017, Davison appeared in an episode of the third series of Grantchester, playing a cricket-loving solicitor.

In 2018, Davison appeared with Christopher Timothy in the three-part series Great British Car Journeys (known internationally as Vintage Roads Great & Small) for More4. In the first series the pair travelled in a Morgan 4/4 on three trips from London to Land's End, from Loch Ness to The Isle of Skye and from Cardiff to Snowdonia. On each trip, which was themed around the 'Golden Age of Motoring', the pair would meet people involved with the vintage car scene and take rides in a number of vintage cars. The series was recommissioned by Channel 4 for a second series on More4, with the four-part series starting off with a trip through Yorkshire on 12 October 2019.

In April 2020, Davison was asked to narrate the tenth season of Channel 5's documentary series, The Yorkshire Vet, which follows a number of veterinarians working in Weatherby, Kirkbymoorside and Huddersfield. Christopher Timothy had been the programme's narrator since the start of the series, but he was self-isolating due to the COVID-19 pandemic lockdown. Davison's home was equipped with a recording studio, making the role practical for him. For the next series, Timothy was back as the narrator, though Davison would appear again in the 2021 Christmas Special, The Yorkshire Vet at Christmas: It's a Wonderful Life appearing on-screen with Kirkbymoorside-based vet Peter Wright (from Gracey Lane Vets), in a number of short dramatic scenes which linked the stories from each of the three vet practices featured.

Radio
Davison has appeared in several radio series, including the BBC Radio 4 comedy drama series King Street Junior in 1985. Davison played teacher Eric Brown, however, he left after two series and was replaced by Karl Howman (as Philip Sims). In 1995, he appeared in Change at Oglethorpe, and the following year he played Richard Stubbs in a six-part comedy called Minor Adjustment.

He played Dr Anthony Webster in the comedy series Rigor Mortis on Radio 4 in 2003 and 2006, and made a guest appearance in the first episode of the second series of the BBC Radio 4 science fiction comedy series Nebulous, broadcast in April 2006,

In 2008, he voiced Simon Draycott in the radio adaptation of The Long Dark Tea-Time of the Soul, and between 2012 and 2013 he played Richard Lyons in the BBC Radio 2 comedy Welcome to Our Village, Please Invade Carefully.

Theatre roles
Davison has also worked on the stage. In 1984, he appeared in Neil Simon's Barefoot in the Park at the Apollo Theatre alongside his then wife, Sandra Dickinson. In 1991, he appeared in Arsenic and Old Lace at the Chichester Festival Theatre.  Further theatre appearances during the 1990s include: The Last Yankee, by Arthur Miller at the Young Vic Theatre and later the Duke of York's Theatre, London in 1993, and Vatelin in An Absolute Turkey, by Georges Feydeau, at the Gielgud Theatre in 1994. In 1996 he played the role of Tony Wendice in the theatrical production of Dial M for Murder, and in 1997 he played Buttons in the pantomime Cinderella in the Arts Theatre in Cambridge.

He appeared as Amos Hart in Chicago at the Adelphi Theatre in 1999, and played Dr Jean-Pierre Moulineaux, in Under the Doctor at the Churchill Theatre, Bromley and later at the Comedy Theatre, London in 2001.

Between July 2007 and March 2008, Davison performed as King Arthur in the London production of Spamalot.

Throughout 2010 and 2011, he appeared as Professor Callahan in the West End production of Legally Blonde, which opened at the Savoy Theatre.

Davison played the part of Oliver Lucas in David Hare's play The Vertical Hour at the Park Theatre, London between September and October 2014.

In 2015, he joined the cast of Gypsy in its West End transfer to the Savoy Theatre in London, playing the role of Herbie, alongside Imelda Staunton as Rose. The role was originally played by Kevin Whately during its run in Chichester in 2014.

Other work
Davison and his wife composed and performed the theme tunes to Button Moon, a children's programme broadcast in the 1980s, and Mixed Blessings, a sitcom broadcast on ITV in 1978. Davison subsequently appeared alongside Dickinson as the Dish of the Day in the television version of The Hitchhiker's Guide to the Galaxy in 1981. The producers considered it humorous for an actor known for playing a veterinary surgeon to appear as a cow.

The couple have a daughter, Georgia Tennant, born in 1984. Davison and Dickinson divorced in 1994.

Davison has also appeared in several British sitcoms, including Holding the Fort (1980–82) and Sink or Swim (1980–82), as well as appearing in dramatic roles.

He was the subject of This Is Your Life in 1982 when he was surprised by Eamonn Andrews while filming a promotional piece for Doctor Who in Trafalgar Square in London.

Other ventures
Davison lent his name to be used to endorse two science-fiction anthology books published by Hutchinson: Peter Davison's Book of Alien Monsters released in 1982 and Peter Davison's Book of Alien Planets released in 1983.

Personal life
Davison has been married three times. His 1973 marriage to Diane J. Russell ended with divorce in 1975.

On 26 December 1978, he married American-British actress Sandra Dickinson. The couple divorced in 1994. Davison's daughter from his second marriage is actress Georgia Tennant (née Moffett) (1984). In December 2011, Georgia married actor David Tennant, who played the Tenth Doctor.

Davison married his third wife, actress and writer Elizabeth Morton, in 2003. The couple live in Twickenham and have two sons, Louis (born 1999) and Joel (born 2001). They both appeared in The Five(ish) Doctors playing themselves. Louis Moffett made his professional theatrical acting debut aged 14, playing Prince Edward in the 2014 Trafalgar Studios stage production of Richard III, credited as Louis Davison, having adopted his father's stage name as his own. His brother Joel also made his theatrical debut aged 13 in the summer of 2014, playing Jack in The Widowing of Mrs Holroyd at the Orange Tree Theatre, Richmond. Louis Davison plays the part of Victor in Tim Burton's film, Miss Peregrine's Home for Peculiar Children released in 2016, and Joel Davison played Lord Heybrook in French Without Tears at the Orange Tree Theatre, Richmond. Louis  has appeared as Parker Whitfield in BBC One's Holby City, and as King Edmund Ironside in Netflix's Vikings: Valhalla.

Davison's autobiography, titled Is There Life Outside the Box?: An Actor Despairs, was published on 6 October 2016.

Politics
In April 2010, Davison declared his support for the Labour Party at the general election of that year. He was also one of 48 celebrities who signed a letter warning voters against Conservative Party policy towards the BBC.

Davison publicly supported the UK's membership of the European Union in the 2016 EU referendum, describing Brexit supporters as "mad old farts who want to return the country to an age that never existed".

Filmography

Film

Television

Non-acting television

Theatre

Radio and CD audio drama

Video games

Books

References

External links

 
 Peter Davison Biography – British Film Institute
 Violence & Vulnerability – Peter Davison article at Kasterborous.com
 Chicago TARDIS 2011 – Peter Davison Interview on The Omega Podcast
 

1951 births
20th-century English male actors
21st-century English male actors
Alumni of the Royal Central School of Speech and Drama
English male radio actors
English male stage actors
English male television actors
English people of Guyanese descent
Labour Party (UK) people
Living people
Male actors from London
Male actors from Surrey
People from Streatham
People from the Borough of Woking